Tremosine sul Garda is a comune in the Italian province of Brescia, in Lombardy, near Lake Garda. It is divided into 18 frazioni; Pieve is the frazione which has the town hall. Vesio is the biggest one. Campione is a frazione famous for aquatic sport, such as kitesurfing, and it is the only one on the shore of Lake Garda.

History
The first human settlement dates back to Neolithic times. Rich vegetation and abundant water encouraged migration from south of Lake Garda. There is no information about the period from 3000 BC to the Roman era. During the Ancient Roman period, rich Romans owned villas in Tremosine.

It became part of the Republic of Venice in 1426. The main activities in Tremosine were agriculture (olive trees, grapevines and fruit) and farming (goats, cows and donkeys). There were also a little iron industry and a manganese cave in Sermerio. In San Michele and Val di Brasa there were metallurgic centres where it was possible to utilize hydraulic energy.

Frazioni
Arias, Bazzanega, Cadignano, Campione, Castone, Mezzema, Musio, Pieve (the main Frazione), Pregasio, Priezzo, Secastello, Sermerio, Sompriezzo, Ustecchio, Vesio, Villa, Voiandes, Voltino

Twin town 

  North Adams, Massachusetts, USA (since 2005)

References

External links 
Guida indipendente alla vita di Tremosine - Independent guide to Tremosine's life
Tremosine Culture - Gruppo di idee La Löm
Pro Loco - official site

Cities and towns in Lombardy
Populated places on Lake Garda